Senator Riordan may refer to:

Daniel E. Riordan (1863–1942), Wisconsin State Senate
Daniel J. Riordan (1870–1923), New York State Senate